NS15, NS-15, NS 15, NS.15, or variation, may refer to:

Places
 Yio Chu Kang MRT station (station code: NS15), Ang Mo Kio, Singapore
 Cumberland South (constituency N.S. 15), Nova Scotia, Canada
 Para District (FIPS region code NS15), Suriname

Other uses
 Blue Origin NS-15, a 2021 April 14 Blue Origin suborbital spaceflight mission for the New Shepard
 RAF N.S. 15, a British NS class airship
 New Penguin Shakespeare volume 15

See also

 NS (disambiguation)
 15 (disambiguation)